(born 1 September 1970) is a Japanese former ski jumper.

Career
He competed from 1991 to 2002. He won a gold medal at the 1998 Winter Olympics in Nagano in the Team large hill event. Saito is a three-time FIS Nordic World Ski Championships medalist with two silvers (1995: Individual normal hill and 1997: Team large hill) and one bronze (1995: Team large hill).

World Cup

Standings

Wins

External links
 
 

1970 births
Ski jumpers at the 1998 Winter Olympics
Japanese male ski jumpers
Living people
Olympic ski jumpers of Japan
Olympic medalists in ski jumping
FIS Nordic World Ski Championships medalists in ski jumping
Medalists at the 1998 Winter Olympics
Sportspeople from Hokkaido
People from Yoichi, Hokkaido
Olympic gold medalists for Japan